Chong Er's Preach, also known as The Legend of Chong Er is a 2019 Chinese historical romantic comedy television series directed by Lai Shuiqing and Zhao Jian and starring Wang Longhua, Baby Zhang, Zhang Yishan, Madina Memet, Purba Rgyal, Shen Mengchen, and Gan Tingting. It is produced jointly by China Film Group Corporation, Global Hao Xiang Television Media and Shenzhen Yucong Cultural Media Co., Ltd.. The television series follows the story of the Duke Wen of Jin from exile to later ascending the throne to become king. This television series has a 2.6 rating on Douban.

Plot
This is the story of Chong Er (Wang Longhua), a talented and kind prince. He is entangled in romantic relationships with Li Ji (Madina Memet), Qi Jiang (Zhang Hanyun), Qin Yingyue (Shen Mengchen), and Ji Wei (Gan Tingting), and faces numerous assassinations.

Cast

Main
 Wang Longhua as Chong Er, the second son of the Duke Xian of Jin.
 Baby Zhang as Qi Jiang, princess of Qi State.
 Zhang Yishan as Yi Wu, the third son of the Duke Xian of Jin
 Madina Memet as Li Ji, the elder princess of Lirong State
 Purba Rgyal as Shen Sheng, the first son of the Duke Xian of Jin.
 Lan Yan as Consort Jia Ji
 Shen Mengchen as Ying Yue
 Gan Tingting as Ji Wei
 He Gang as Jie Zitui, an aristocrat who serves the Jin prince Chong'er.
 Guo Xiaoran as Zhao Cui, a general of the Jin State.

Supporting
 Cheng Yuanyuan as Consort Shao, the second princess of Lirong State
 Lin Yongjian as Duke Mu of Qin
 Wang Yan as Consort Hu
 Wang Gang as the monarch of Lirong State
 Yvonne Yung as Consort Qi
 Gong Beibi as Consort Yun
 Chen Zihan as Consort of the King of Zhou
 Bao Jianfeng as Duke Huan of Tian Qi
 Li Zonghan as Tai Hao
 Mai Hongmei as the empress of Lirong State
 Hou Yaohua as Uncle Hu
 Liu Jinshan as King of Zhou

Soundtrack

Production
Principal photography started on 11 May 2016 and wrapped on September 7 of that same year. Most of the television series was shot on location in Xiangshan Film and Television Town, Hengdian World Studios and Beijing.

On June 13, 2016, Lan Yan was cast in the television series to play Consort Jia, younger sister of General Jia Hua and beautiful consort who is married to Prince Shen Sheng of the Jin State. On July 19, Li Zonghan was cast in a supporting role as Tai Hao in the television series.

Ratings 

 Highest ratings are marked in red, lowest ratings are marked in blue

References

External links
 
 
 

2019 Chinese television series debuts
2019 Chinese television series endings
Chinese historical television series
Jin (Chinese state)